Aaron Bancroft (November 10, 1755 – August 19, 1839) was an American clergyman. He was born in Reading, Massachusetts to Samuel Bancroft and Lydia Parker.

Biography
He began his studies during the American Revolution, and served as a minuteman, and was present, at the battles of both Lexington and Bunker Hill. He graduated from Harvard in 1778 and subsequently taught, studied theology and spent three years as a missionary in Yarmouth, Nova Scotia. In 1785 he settled in Worcester, Massachusetts as pastor of the Congregational church, and remained in the same post until his death in 1839. During the middle of his life his theological views leaned toward Arminianism and by his advocacy of liberalism he became a noted leader in the early period of the Unitarian schism. He published a eulogy of George Washington in 1800 and wrote a subsequent biography of Washington in 1807. He was elected a Fellow of the American Academy of Arts and Sciences in 1805, and was a founding member of the American Antiquarian Society in 1812, for which he served as vice-president from 1816 to 1831. Although president of the American Unitarian Association, he adhered to the name and system of Congregationalism until his death in Worcester, Massachusetts.

His son was George Bancroft, American historian, United States Secretary of the Navy and United States Ambassador to the United Kingdom.

Works 
Bancroft, Aaron. Life of George Washington Commander in Chief of the American Army Through the Revolutionary War, and the First President of the United States. London: Printed for J. Stockdale, 1808.

Notes

References 
Christie, Francis Albert. "Bancroft, Aaron." Dictionary of American Biography. Vol. 1, Charles Scribner's Sons. 1928
worldcat Accessed December 25, 2009

1755 births
1839 deaths
Massachusetts militiamen in the American Revolution
Harvard University alumni
American Congregationalist ministers
18th-century Congregationalist ministers
19th-century Congregationalist ministers
Arminian ministers
Arminian writers
American Congregationalist missionaries
Fellows of the American Academy of Arts and Sciences
Members of the American Antiquarian Society
Gardiner family
Congregationalist missionaries in the United States
People of colonial Massachusetts